Jonathan Healy (born October 10, 1945, in Greenfield, Massachusetts) is an American politician who represented the 1st Franklin district in the Massachusetts House of Representatives from 1971 to 1993 and served as the state's Commissioner of Food and Agriculture from 1993 to 2003.

References

1945 births
Republican Party members of the Massachusetts House of Representatives
People from Greenfield, Massachusetts
Williams College alumni
Living people
People from Charlemont, Massachusetts